The Year of Intelligent Tigers is a BBC Books original novel written by Kate Orman and based on the long-running British science fiction television series Doctor Who. It features the Eighth Doctor, Fitz and Anji.

Synopsis
The alien world of Hitchemus is known for its animal sanctuaries and the musical talents of the citizens. Now the animals have escaped, a hurricane is threatening everyone and the humans do not want the Doctor's assistance. His companions are left to deal with the situation when the Doctor vanishes into the wild.

External links

2001 British novels
2001 science fiction novels
Eighth Doctor Adventures
British science fiction novels
Novels by Kate Orman
Books about tigers